"Cold Heart (Pnau remix)" is a song by English singer and songwriter Elton John and English-Albanian singer Dua Lipa from the former's 32nd studio album, The Lockdown Sessions (2021). Created during the pandemic of COVID-19, the collaboration between the artists was a testament to the friendship, which was established in November 2020. The song was penned by John, Andrew Meecham, Bernie Taupin, Dean Meredith, Nicholas Littlemore, Peter Mayes and Sam Littlemore, with the production completed by the latter three as part of Pnau. It was released as the lead single from the album for digital download and streaming in various countries by EMI and Mercury on 13 August 2021. Interpolating John's songs "Rocket Man" (1972), "Kiss the Bride" (1983), "Sacrifice" (1989) and "Where's the Shoorah?" (1976), it is an upbeat contemporary synth-pop, dance, dance-pop and pop song, describing the decline of a relationship.

"Cold Heart (Pnau remix)" reached the top position in the United Kingdom and marked Lipa's third and John's eighth chart-topping single on the UK Singles Chart. The song achieved number one in the rankings of 12 other countries, including Australia, Canada and New Zealand. It also entered the top 10 in an additional of 22 countries, including Ireland, South Africa and the United States. It peaked atop the Canadian AC, CHR/Top 40 and Hot AC as well as the US Adult Contemporary, Adult Top 40 and Hot Dance/Electronic Songs rankings, respectively. The song received two gold and multiple platinum certifications as well as two diamond awards from the Syndicat National de l'Édition Phonographique (SNEP) in France and the Polish Society of the Phonographic Industry (ZPAV) in Poland, respectively. In 2022, it won an award in the category for the Collaboration of the Year at the American Music Awards and the Top Dance/Electronic Song at the Billboard Music Awards.

"Cold Heart (Pnau remix)" was met with a warm reception from music critics for its lyrics, sound and the incorporation of John's four songs. Produced during the pandemic, the animated music video premiered on John's YouTube channel on 13 August 2021, with the aspiration of crafting a celebratory and joyful galaxy. It traces the adventure of John and Lipa together with four other animated characters as they explore the colorful and nature-filled psychedelic landscapes. Three remixes accompanied the song, including a rendition by Claptone and The Blessed Madonna. The song was further promoted with a live performance in Los Angeles on 20 November as part of John's Farewell Yellow Brick Road tour, which was streamed on Disney+. In 2022, it was ranked among the 10th most-streamed songs globally on Apple Music and Spotify.

Background and development 

Due to the outbreak of the pandemic of COVID-19, John was compelled to temporarily halt his Farewell Yellow Brick Road world tour in March 2020. Amidst the lockdown caused by the pandemic, the singer pursued a series of collaborations, one of which was "Cold Heart (Pnau remix)" with Lipa, as part of his upcoming studio album. The album's songs were recorded over an 18-month period, either remotely or in compliance with strict health and safety regulations or through the use of the American software Zoom. Leading up to its release, John and Lipa previewed their collaborative effort by publishing cartoon representations of themselves, while dancing to a disco melody on their respective social media accounts on 10 August 2021. The following day, the artists confirmed the song's title "Cold Heart (Pnau remix)" and announced its release date set for 13 August. The collaboration between the artists on the song was a testament to the friendship forged between the two, which was established through John's participation in Lipa's Studio 2054 livestream in November 2020 and further strengthened by Lipa's performance at the Elton John AIDS Foundation Academy Awards Viewing Party in August 2021. John stated, "[Lipa has] given me so much energy. She's a truly wonderful artist, and person, absolutely bursting with creativity and ideas. The energy she brought to ['the song'] just blew my mind." Lipa further added, "It has been an absolute honour and privilege to collaborate on this track with him. It's so very special [...] I loved being part of such a creative and joyous experience."

Music and lyrics 

"Cold Heart (Pnau remix)" was penned by John, Andrew Meecham, Bernie Taupin, Dean Meredith, Nicholas Littlemore, Peter Mayes and Sam Littlemore, with the production completed by the latter three, who form the group Pnau. Constructed in the verse–chorus form, the verses have an Fm7–Bm7–Em7 chord progression, while the bridges follows a Bm7–Em7–G-Fm7 sequence. The song was released for digital download and streaming in various countries by EMI and Mercury on 13 August 2021 as the lead single from John's 32nd studio album The Lockdown Sessions (2021). Paying homage to John's career, it interpolates his songs "Rocket Man" (1972), "Kiss the Bride" (1983), "Sacrifice" (1989) and "Where's the Shoorah?" (1976). The sample of "Where's the Shoorah?" appears at the three-minute mark, with a tempo from 116 bpm to 130 bpm and a key shifted from an E-flat major to B-flat minor. "Cold Heart (Pnau remix)" is an upbeat, contemporary synth-pop, dance, dance-pop and pop song, with club, disco and house beats. The lyrics transmit the chorus from "Rocket Man", which includes "And I think it's gonna be a long, long time 'til touchdown brings me 'round again to find / I'm not the man they think I am at home", and verses from "Sacrifice", such as "Cold, cold heart / hard done by you / Some things look better baby / Just passing through". They describe a relationship that has taken a turn for the worse due to the hardening of the singer's heart.

Critical reception and accolades 

"Cold Heart (Pnau remix)" was met with a warm reception from music critics, with many complimenting the combination of John's previous hits in the song. David Smyth from Evening Standard characterised the song as a "particularly slick updating of classic Elton". Annie Zaleski for Variety declared the end result of the mashup to be "relentlessly modern, a seamless (and savvy) [fusion] of eras". Althea Legaspi of Rolling Stone highlighted that the songs received a "groove-tipped refresh" in the song. Lars Brandle from Billboard described the mashup as "expertly created". Billboard Stephen Daw thought that "Dua Lipa's voice sounds like butter as she croons the iconic chorus 'And I think it's gonna be a long, long time,' while the production from PNAU never goes over-the-top, only complementing John's original visions."  Helen Brown of The Independent penned that the song "does a terrific job [combining] 'Sacrifice' and 'Rocket Man', giving both a tendon-twanging freshness". Lakshmi Govindrajan Javeri from Firstpost elaborated that the song "blends iconic portions of 'Sacrifice' and 'Rocket Man' to create a number that puritans will grudgingly admit is addictive at best, sacrilegious at worst". 

Emily Lee for iHeart commented that the mashup "may seem like a chaotic choice [but] Pnau [...] pull it together seamlessly". Robert Moran for Sydney Morning Herald dubbed the song "ubiquitous", commending its blend of "Lipa's vocals on the hook and Pnau's atmospheric house sound and signature chants". Daniela Avila of People labeled the song as a "perfect dancefloor singalong". Charlie Dukes from Renowned for Sound marked the song as a "modern anthem" that "the world never knew it needed". Gary Ryan for NME inscribed that the song "imperiously drapes itself over the disco-revival chaise longue". Will Hodgkinson of the Times wrote that the song "sounds cheesy as hell, yet the end result is so vibrant that you cannot help but be cheered by it". Jordan Robledo from Gay Times praised John and Lipa's "incredible" vocal delivery that are "sure to leave fans yearning for their own trip to the dance floor". In conclusion, Jem Aswad for Variety found the song "a living example of [John's] legendary patronage of younger artists and represents a new concept in mainstream musical reinvention". Terry Staunton of Record Collector was less impressed, deriding it as "awkward" and "a little out of step".

In 2022, "Cold Heart (Pnau remix)" won an award in the category for the Collaboration of the Year at the American Music Awards and the Top Dance/Electronic Song at the Billboard Music Awards. It was nominated for the Song of the Year at the Brit Awards, the Most Performed Work at the Ivor Novello Awards and the Best Collaboration and Song of the Year at the MTV Video Music Awards. In 2023, the song received nominations for the Best Collaboration and Dance Song of the Year at the iHeartRadio Music Awards. Billboard and Los Angeles Times included "Cold Heart (Pnau remix)" in their year-end lists of the best songs for 2021. During the summer of 2022, the song was ranked as the 19th most-streamed song on Spotify worldwide. On the year-end lists, it was ranked as the sixth and seventh most-streamed song on Spotify and Apple, respectively. The song was also the most "shazamed" song of the year on Shazam worldwide of that year. John and Lipa were further recognised as the "Hitmakers of the Year" by the American magazine Variety in 2022, for the charting success of their collaboration on the charts.

Commercial performance 

In the United Kingdom, "Cold Heart (Pnau remix)" debuted at number 33 on the UK Singles Chart in the issue dated 26 August 2021. The song reached number one, having spent three consecutive weeks at number 2, with sales of 64,000, including 5.9 million streams and 5,000 copies on limited edition CD single, in its ninth week on the chart on 21 October. It represented Lipa's third chart-topping single in the UK, after "New Rules" (2017) and "One Kiss" (2018), and John's eighth and first in 16 years, since he was featured artist on American rapper 2Pac's posthumous single Ghetto Gospel (2005). John also became the first solo artist to achieve a top 10 single in six different decades, spanning from the 1970s to the 2020s. In April 2022, the song received double platinum certification from the British Phonographic Industry (BPI) for shifting more than 1,200,000 units in the UK. In Australia, "Cold Heart (Pnau remix)" reached number one on the ARIA Singles Chart for 10 consecutive weeks as well as number one on the New Zealand Singles Chart in New Zealand. The song marked Lipa's first chart-topping single in Australia as well as John's first one since "Something About the Way You Look Tonight"/"Candle in the Wind 1997" in 1997. Also in 2022, it garnered a quadruple certification from the Recorded Music New Zealand (RMNZ) in New Zealand and a septuple platinum award from the Australian Recording Industry Association (ARIA) in Australia for selling more than 120,000 and 490,000 units, respectively.

In Canada, "Cold Heart (Pnau remix)" reached number one on the Canadian Hot 100 in the issue dated 8 January 2022, having spent a total of 12 consecutive weeks. The song also reached the top position on the Canada AC, CHR/Top 40 and Hot AC rankings, respectively. In October 2022, it received a septuple platinum certification from Music Canada (MC) for shifting more than 560,000 units in the Canada. In the United States, "Cold Heart (Pnau remix)" entered the Billboard Hot 100 at number 81 on 28 August 2021 and rose to number 32 in its fifth week, giving John the longest span of top 40 Hot 100 appearances, excluding holiday fare. The song reached its summit at number 7 on the ranking issue dated 15 January 2022, earning Lipa's fourth top 10 single on the chart and John's 28th entry. Topping the Adult Contemporary and Adult Top 40 rankings, it further peaked at number one on the Hot Dance/Electronic Songs chart, logging its 34th week at the top on 11 June. In May 2022, the song garnered a double certification from the Recording Industry Association of America (RIAA) in the US for selling more than 2,000,000 units.

"Cold Heart (Pnau remix)" reached the top position in Bulgaria, the Commonwealth of Independent States (CIS), Croatia, the Czech Republic, Iceland, Lithuania, Mexico, Poland, Ukraine and the Wallon region of Belgium. Top 10 positions were also achieved in Austria, Costa Rica, Denmark, El Salvador, the Flemish region of Belgium, France, Germany, Greece, Hungary, Ireland, Italy, Luxembourg, Netherlands, Norway, Portugal, Romania, Russia, Slovakia, South Africa, Sweden, Switzerland and Uruguay. The song received a gold certifications from IFPI Greece in Greece and IFPI Switzerland in Switzerland. It was certified double platinum in Denmark, Mexico and Norway as well as tripple platinum in Austria, Italy, Portugal, Spain and Sweden. The song further garnered a diamond certification from the Syndicat National de l'Édition Phonographique (SNEP) in France and the Polish Society of the Phonographic Industry (ZPAV) in Poland.

Music video and promotion 

To accompany the release, a music video for "Cold Heart (Pnau remix)" premiered to John's official YouTube channel on 13 August 2021. Created in the isolation of the pandemic, Raman Djafari of Blink Ink directed the animated and imaginative video with the aspiration of crafting a galaxy "full of celebration, dance and joy". Gareth Owen and Josef Byrne produced the video with the characters of John and Lipa being designed by Seo Young. The video traces the adventure of John and Lipa, portrayed as animated characters, together with four claymation-described 3D characters that dance to disco music, as they explore through colorful and nature-filled galaxies and psychedelic landscapes. In a sequence, the use of hand-drawn 2D elements enhances the visual frames, imparting an ethereal atmosphere to the animation. One of the dancers draws a shooting star in the sky, while flying fish appear to radiate from the movements of their dancing shoes. At the same time, towering flowers with eyes emerge and envelop the dancers, imbuing them with a sense of nature. There is also psychedelic countryside sequence featuring flowers with puckered petals that sway in time with the music, and clouds that are fashioned into the shapes of unicorns and castles. The animated charactes bring their journey to a close by joining John and Lipa in an dance celebration at a garden party located on one side of the Milky Way. John Russell from Grazia expressed his admiration for the video, while characterising it as "gorgeous" and highlighting its animation theme. Robledo for Gay Times referred to the video as "stunning" and deemed it to be "a fun and mind-blowing experience". Paulina Vales of the Honey Pop declared the video as the year's "most iconic animated video" and commended its aesthetics and fashion, writing that "[John and Lipa brought] us joy we were missing in our life".

While being streamed by American streaming platform Disney+, John and Lipa performed "Cold Heart (Pnau remix)" live at Dodger Stadium in Los Angeles as part of the former's Farewell Yellow Brick Road world tour on 20 November 2022. Three remixes of the song, including a rendition by German disc jockey Claptone and American disc jockey the Blessed Madonna, accompanied the single's release between September and October 2021. The rendition by the Blessed Madonna marked the second time that she had remixed a song from Lipa, following the remix of "Levitating" (2020). Samantha Reis from We Rave You gave a favorable assessment of the remix, stating that it took the already "club-ready beat" and elevated its "clubby vibe" to the maximum. Ariel King for Dancing Astronaut also positively commented that the remix "fits neatly into a sparkling club atmosphere while maintaining Lipa's disco aesthetic". The remix was accompanied by a visualiser video as a remix of the official music video, displaying animated eyes and fantastical creatures.

Track listing 

Digital download and streaming
"Cold Heart" (Pnau Remix)3:22

Digital download and streaming
"Cold Heart" (Acoustic)3:15

Digital download and streaming
"Cold Heart" (Claptone Remix)3:03

Digital download and streaming
"Cold Heart" (PS1 Remix)2:47

Digital download and streaming
"Cold Heart" (The Blessed Madonna Remix)2:53
"Cold Heart" (The Blessed Madonna Extended Mix)4:33

Credits and personnel 

Credits adapted from Tidal.

Elton Johnlead artist, composing, songwriting
Dua Lipalead artist
Pnaulead artists, remixing
Nicholas Littlemorecomposing, producing, programming, songwriting
Peter Mayescomposing, engineering, producing, programming, songwriting
Sam Littlemorecomposing, producing, programming, songwriting
Andrew Meechamcomposing, songwriting
Bernie Taupincomposing, songwriting
Dean Meredithcomposing, songwriting
Josh Gudwinmastering, mixing
Mark Schickvocal producing
Rafael Fadulengineering

Charts

Weekly charts

Monthly charts

Year-end charts

Certifications

Release history

See also 

List of Australian chart achievements and milestones
List of Billboard Adult Contemporary number ones of 2022
List of Billboard Adult Top 40 number-one songs of the 2020s
List of Billboard Hot Dance/Electronic Songs number ones
List of Billboard Mexico Airplay number ones
List of Canadian Hot 100 number-one singles of 2022
List of Media Forest most-broadcast songs of the 2020s in Romania
List of number-one singles of 2021 (Australia)
List of number-one singles of 2021 (Poland)
List of number-one singles of 2022 (Australia)
List of number-one songs of the 2020s (Czech Republic)
List of number-one singles of the 2020s (Hungary)
List of UK Singles Chart number ones of the 2020s
List of Ultratop 50 number-one singles of 2021
New Zealand top 50 singles of 2022

References 

2021 singles
2021 songs
Elton John songs
Dua Lipa songs
Pnau songs
Mashup songs
Animated music videos
Songs with lyrics by Bernie Taupin
Songs with music by Elton John
Songs written by Nick Littlemore
Songs written by Peter Mayes
Songs written by Sam Littlemore
EMI Records singles
Mercury Records singles
Canadian Hot 100 number-one singles
Number-one singles in Australia
Number-one singles in New Zealand
Number-one singles in Poland
Number-one singles in the Commonwealth of Independent States
Ultratop 50 Singles (Wallonia) number-one singles
UK Singles Chart number-one singles